The Foscue–Whitfield House, best known as the Foscue House, is a historic Federal style plantation house just outside the city limits of Demopolis, Alabama, United States.

History
The Foscue House was built in 1840 by Augustus Foscue as the family residence for his plantation.  In 1855 Augustus' daughter, Mary Alice Foscue, married Dr. Bryan Watkins Whitfield, son of the builder of Gaineswood.  Augustus died in 1861 and the house was inherited by Mary and her husband.  The house has remained in the Whitfield family to the present day and was recently restored by a descendant.

Description
The house is two and a half stories and built with handmade brick. It features a five-bay facade at the front elevation and a gabled roof.  A new brick addition was built onto the front of the house in 1849, requiring the removal of a two-tiered, columned entrance portico. A smaller columned entrance portico was added at that time.  The full-width front porch with a hipped roof was added in 1920 by Jesse Whitfield, grandson of the builder, replacing the portico from 1849.

References

National Register of Historic Places in Marengo County, Alabama
Houses on the National Register of Historic Places in Alabama
Houses in Demopolis, Alabama
Houses completed in 1840
Plantation houses in Alabama
Whitfield family residences